Saros cycle series 146 for solar eclipses occurs at the Moon's descending node, repeating every 18 years, 11 days, containing 76 events. All eclipses in this series occurs at the Moon's descending node.

This solar saros is linked to Lunar Saros 139.

Saros 146 

It is a part of Saros cycle 146, repeating every 18 years, 11 days, containing 76 events. The series started with partial solar eclipse on September 19, 1541. It contains total eclipses from May 29, 1938 through October 7, 2154, hybrid eclipses from October 17, 2172 through November 20, 2226, and annular eclipses from December 1, 2244 through August 10, 2659. The series ends at member 76 as a partial eclipse on December 29, 2893. The longest duration of totality was 5 minutes, 21 seconds on June 30, 1992.
<noinclude>

Umbral eclipses
Umbral eclipses (annular, total and hybrid) can be further classified as either: 1) Central (two limits), 2) Central (one limit) or 3) Non-Central (one limit). The statistical distribution of these classes in Saros series 146 appears in the following table.

Events

References 
 http://eclipse.gsfc.nasa.gov/SEsaros/SEsaros146.html

External links
Saros cycle 146 - Information and visualization

Solar saros series